Ruben Cantu Airport  is an airport serving Atalaya District, of the Veraguas Province of Panama.

See also

Transport in Panama
List of airports in Panama

References

External links

FallingRain - Ruben Cantu

Airports in Panama
Buildings and structures in Veraguas Province
Santiago de Veraguas